The 2011 McDonald's Burnie International was a professional tennis tournament played on hard courts. It was the ninth edition of the tournament which was part of the 2011 ATP Challenger Tour and ITF Women's Circuit. It took place in Burnie, Tasmania, Australia, between 31 January – 6 February 2011.

ATP singles main-draw entrants

Seeds

 Rankings are as of January 17, 2011.

Other entrants
The following players received wildcards into the singles main draw:
  Chris Guccione
  James Lemke
  Luke Saville
  Bernard Tomic

The following players received entry from the qualifying draw:
  Érik Chvojka
  James Duckworth
  Joel Lindner
  Benjamin Mitchell

WTA singles main-draw entrants

Seeds

 Rankings are as of January 17, 2011.

Other entrants
The following players received wildcards into the singles main draw:
  Daniella Dominikovic
  Azra Hadzic
  Alyssa Hibberd
  Stefani Stojic

The following players received entry from the qualifying draw:
  Bojana Bobusic
  Eugenie Bouchard
  Nastja Kolar
  Yulia Putintseva
  Zheng Saisai
  Daniela Scivetti
  Emelyn Starr
  Belinda Woolcock

Champions

Men's singles

 Flavio Cipolla def.  Chris Guccione, walkover

Men's doubles

 Philip Bester /  Peter Polansky def.  Marinko Matosevic /  Rubin Jose Statham, 6–3, 4–6, [14–12]

Women's singles

 Eugenie Bouchard def.  Zheng Saisai, 6–4, 6–3

Women's doubles

 Natsumi Hamamura /  Erika Takao def.  Sally Peers /  Olivia Rogowska, 6–2, 3–6, 10–7

External links
Official Website
ITF Search 
ATP official site

McDonald's Burnie International
McDonald's Burnie International
McD
Burnie International